Petter Menning (né Öström on 8 August 1987) is a Swedish sprint canoeist. He won the gold medal in the men's K-1 200 metres at the European Championships. Later in 2013, he won the world title in the same event. He was named Swedish Kayaker of the Year in 2013 and 2014. Menning placed tenth over K-1 200 m at the 2016 Olympics and at the 2020 Olympics he placed sixth over the same distance.

References

External links

1987 births
Swedish male canoeists
ICF Canoe Sprint World Championships medalists in kayak
Living people
European Games medalists in canoeing
Canoeists at the 2015 European Games
European Games gold medalists for Sweden
Canoeists at the 2016 Summer Olympics
Olympic canoeists of Sweden
Canoeists at the 2019 European Games
Canoeists at the 2020 Summer Olympics